Samson of Mauvoisin (died 1161) was the French archbishop of Reims from 1140 to 1161.

He is a significant historical figure of his times. He undertook the capture of Eon d'Etoile, self-proclaimed Messiah. He was concerned about heresy spread by weavers.

He acted for Eleanor of Aquitaine, in her divorce case from Louis VII of France. He participated in the general declaration of peace made by Louis at Soissons, in 1155.

Notes

External links
 Letter to Bernard of Clairvaux
 Letter to Pope Innocent II

1161 deaths
Archbishops of Reims
12th-century Roman Catholic archbishops in France
Year of birth unknown